This is a timeline of Early Independent Vietnam, covering the period of Vietnamese history from the rise of the Tĩnh Hải circuit ruled by the Khúc clan (r. 905–923/930) to the kingdom of Đại Cồ Việt ruled by the Early Lê dynasty (980–1009).

10th century

11th century

Gallery

Citations

References 

History of Vietnam